Dharmashila Chapagain is a Nepalese politician, belonging to the Communist Party of Nepal (Maoist Centre) [CPN(M)]. In January 2007 she was nominated to the interim legislature of Nepal on behalf of the CPN(M). In April 2008, she won the Jhapa-4 seat in the Constituent Assembly election with 19289 votes.

In 2011, she was serving as the Minister of State for Health and Population.

References

Living people
Communist Party of Nepal (Maoist Centre) politicians
Women government ministers of Nepal
Nepalese atheists
Place of birth missing (living people)
Nepal MPs 2017–2022
Nepal Communist Party (NCP) politicians
Khas people
Members of the 1st Nepalese Constituent Assembly
1973 births